Florian Vila (unknown – unknown) was an Albanian chess player, two-times Albanian Chess Championship winner (1963, 1973).

Biography
From the begin to 1960s to the begin 1970s Florian Vila was one of Albania's leading chess players. He two times won Albanian Chess Championship: 1963, and 1973.

Florian Vila played for Albania in the Chess Olympiads:
 In 1970, at third board in the 19th Chess Olympiad in Siegen (+7, =4, -4),
 In 1972, at second board in the 20th Chess Olympiad in Skopje (+3, =2, -2).

Florian Vila played for Albania in the European Team Chess Championship preliminaries:
 In 1977, at fourth board in the 6th European Team Chess Championship preliminaries (+1, =0, -2).

References

External links

Florian Vila chess games at 365chess.com

Year of birth missing
Year of death missing
Albanian chess players
Chess Olympiad competitors
20th-century chess players